Daniel "Danny" Naughton (born 24 December 1924 – April 1992) was an English professional rugby league footballer who played in the 1940s and 1950s.

Background
Danny Naughton's birth was registered in Prescot district, Lancashire, England.

Playing career

International honours
Naughton won caps for England while at Widnes in 1949 against Other Nationalities.

Challenge Cup Final appearances
Naughton was absent from Widnes' 0-19 defeat by Warrington in the 1949–50 Challenge Cup Final during the 1949–50 season at Wembley Stadium, London on Saturday 6 May 1950, due to being on the 1950 Great Britain Lions tour to Australia, and New Zealand, though he did not participate in any of the test matches.

Naughton played left-, i.e. number 8, in Warrington's 4-4 draw with Halifax in the 1953–54 Challenge Cup Final during the 1953–54 season at Wembley Stadium, London on Saturday 24 April 1954, in front of a crowd of 81,841, and played left- in the 8-4 victory over Halifax in the 1953–54 Challenge Cup Final replay during the 1953–54 season at Odsal Stadium, Bradford on Wednesday 5 May 1954, in front of a record crowd of 102,575 or more.

Genealogical Information
Naughton's marriage to Rita (née Mercer) was registered during third ¼ 1949 in Prescot district, they had children; Daniel J. Naughton (birth registered during third ¼  in Prescot district), and Ian M. Naughton (birth registered during first ¼  in Prescot district). Danny Naughton was the younger brother of the rugby league  who played in the 1940s and 1950s for Widnes; John "Johnny" Naughton (born 5 January 1920 in Prescot district), and Teresa "Tess" Naughton (birth registered during fourth ¼ 1921 in Prescot district), and the older brother of the rugby league footballer, Albert "Ally" Naughton.

References

External links
Statistics at rugby.widnes.tv*
Statistics at wolvesplayers.thisiswarrington.co.uk

1924 births
1992 deaths
England national rugby league team players
English rugby league players
Great Britain national rugby league team players
Place of death missing
Rugby league players from Prescot
Rugby league props
Warrington Wolves players
Widnes Vikings players